"Meathead" Goldwyn is an American food writer, chef, and website publisher. In 2021 he was elected to the Barbecue Hall Of Fame as the 40th member. He is the author of a New York Times best seller Meathead: The Science of Great Barbecue and Grilling. He is also a former columnist for the Chicago Tribune, the Washington Post, and AOL.

Early life and education

Goldwyn derives his moniker from his father, who jokingly labeled him after the character "Meathead" played by Rob Reiner in the 1970s television show All in the Family. His interest in meat also came from his father who owned a butcher shop and worked as an inspector for the United States Department of Agriculture. He originally studied journalism and photography at the University of Florida but left his senior year and moved to the Midwest. He later earned a Master of Fine Arts from the School of the Art Institute of Chicago.

Career

Goldwyn began working as a wine buyer in the 1970s. He wrote a wine column for the Chicago Tribune from 1978 to 1981, then for the Washington Post from 1982 to 1985. He later established the food and wine coverage in the early years of AOL. He founded the Beverage Testing Institute, Inc, which created The World Wine Championships, World Beer Championships, and World Spirits Championships in the 1980s. He has also taught at Cornell University School of Hotel Administration.

Goldwyn founded AmazingRibs.com in 2005 as a response to a rib cook-off challenge from one of his neighbors. He uses the site to teach cooking methods and recipes, debunk barbecuing myths, and test various equipment. Goldwyn runs the website from his home in suburban Chicago, with more than a dozen different grills and smokers in his backyard.

Outside of AmazingRibs.com, Goldwyn was elected to the Barbecue Hall of Fame in 2021, and is the author of the New York Times Best Seller Meathead: The Science of Great Barbecue and Grilling. It was named one of the “100 Best Cookbooks Of All Time” by Southern Living magazine. His website has been archived by the U.S. Library of Congress Food and Foodways Web Archive along with about 50 other culinary websites.

References

External links
 AmazingRibs.com

Living people
School of the Art Institute of Chicago alumni
American male bloggers
American bloggers
American male non-fiction writers
20th-century American non-fiction writers
American columnists
Chicago Tribune people
The Washington Post journalists
Wine writers
21st-century American male writers
University of Florida alumni
American food writers
20th-century American male writers
21st-century American non-fiction writers
Cornell University faculty
Writers from Chicago
1949 births